Garn-yr-Erw railway station served the village of Garn-yr-erw, in the historical county of Monmouthshire, Wales, from 1913 to 1941 on the Pontypool and Blaenavon Railway.

History 
The station was opened on 1 February 1913 by the London and North Western Railway. It was known as Garn-yr-Erw Halt in the handbook of stations. It closed on 5 May 1941, when passenger services on the line were withdrawn.

References 

Disused railway stations in Torfaen
Former London and North Western Railway stations
Railway stations in Great Britain opened in 1913
Railway stations in Great Britain closed in 1941
1913 establishments in Wales
1941 disestablishments in Wales